Antigua, which was officially known as the Associated State of Antigua was an associated state of the United Kingdom, which was established on 27 February 1967. The associated state was abolished on November 1st, 1981 when Antigua and Barbuda gained its independence.

Government 
The constitution of the former associated state was very similar to the constitution of Antigua and Barbuda, although, there were some differences. For example, executions were constitutionally banned.

The 1967 constitution order also brought many changes to Antigua and Barbuda's government, which include:

 Establishment of the Parliament of Antigua and Barbuda.
 Established the role of premier, which replaced the role of Chief Minister.
 Creation of national symbols, including the flag, coat of arms, and anthem.

References 

Antigua and Barbuda
Constitutions